Chanel is a French fashion house.

Chanel may also refer to:

Places
Chanol, also known as Chanel; a village in India

People 
Coco Chanel (1883–1971), founder of the fashion house
Peter Chanel (1803–1841), Catholic priest, missionary, and martyr
Chanel Cole, singer (born 1977), finalist on Australian Idol
Chanel Contos, Australian sexual consent activist
Chanel Cresswell (born 1990), English actress, best known for playing Kelly in the film This is England
Chanel Iman (born 1990), American fashion model
Chanel Kavanagh (born 1995), judoka from New Zealand
Chanel Miller (born 1992), American writer
Chanel Mokango (born 1988), Congolese professional basketball player
Chanel Petro-Nixon (1989–2006), murder victim from Brooklyn, New York, United States
Chanel Preston (born 1985), American pornographic actress
Chanel Simmonds (born 1992), South African tennis player
Chanel Rion (born 1990), American broadcaster
Chanel Terrero (born 1991), Cuban-Spanish singer, dancer and actress, participant of the Eurovision Song Contest 2022
Chanel West Coast (born 1988), American rapper, singer and television personality
Chanel Wise (born 1985), beauty queen, 2007 Miss America contestant

Arts, entertainment, and media

Music

Groups
 Rats & Star, Japanese pop music group known as "Chanels" until 1983

Songs
"Chanel" (song), a song by Frank Ocean from his 2017 radio show Blonded Radio
"Chanel", a song by Luke
"Chanel", a song by Modern Skirts from their 2008 album All of Us in Our Night
"Chanel", a song by Saigon Kick from their 1992 album The Lizard
"Chanel (Go Get It)", a song by Young Thug from his 2018 mixtape Slime Language

Other arts, entertainment, and media
Chanel Oberlin, fictional character in the U.S. horror-comedy Scream Queens 
The Chanels, Chanel Oberlin's minions, see List of Scream Queens characters
Shit & Chanel, later renamed Shit & Chalou, Danish rock girl band

Other uses
Chanel (dog), world's oldest dog, who died at the age of 21 on August 29, 2009
Chanel College (disambiguation), various schools
Chanel No. 5, perfume launched by Coco Chanel

See also
Channel (disambiguation)
Chanal (disambiguation)
Shannel